Saunshi is a village in the northern state of Karnataka, India. It is located in the Kundgol taluk of Dharwad district in Karnataka. largest gram Panchayat in Dharwad District.

Demographics
As of the 2011 Census of India there were 2,681 households in Saunshi and a total population of 12,848 consisting of 6,501 males and 6,347 females. There were 1,415 children ages 0-6.

Temples
Karisiddeshwar temple, veerkthmath, Fakkireshwara Temple, Shri Guru Brahmananda Temple,Dattatreya Temple, Shri. Shankarlinga Temple and Shri Shiddharoad Temple ,sri  siddeshwara temple .

Transportation
Saunshi is well connected by road, rail

BUS roads are connected From Hubli to Laxmeswara, saunshi will be the central village between these two cities, Saunshi to Hubli-29 km, Saunshi to Laxmeswara-20 km, All KSRTC Bus will have stop at Saunshi
and also public private transportation also available

RAIL Several express and passenger trains ply between Hubli and Bangalore every day, in these All passenger trains will stop at Saunshi, most of the people will travel by train, its very convenient time will take just 20 mins to 30 mins, and price is Rs 10(three time lesser than bus fare),

village information
The village also has government primary health centre (PHC), KLE degree and PU college, government and private high school and primary schools, government ITI college facilities. 
 Dharwad
 Districts of Karnataka
Aditi prabhudeva the actress is from saunshi. Her original name is sudeepana Banakar.

References

External links
 http://Dharwad.nic.in/

Villages in Dharwad district